The 2014 South Australian state election elected members to the 53rd Parliament of South Australia on 15 March 2014, to fill all 47 seats in the House of Assembly (lower house) and 11 of 22 seats in the Legislative Council (upper house). The 12-year-incumbent Australian Labor Party (SA) government, led by Premier Jay Weatherill, won its fourth consecutive four-year term in government, a record 16 years of Labor government, defeating the opposition Liberal Party of Australia (SA), led by Opposition Leader Steven Marshall.

The election resulted in a hung parliament with 23 seats for Labor and 22 for the Liberals. The balance of power rested with the two crossbench independents, Bob Such and Geoff Brock. Such did not indicate whom he would support in a minority government before he went on medical leave for a brain tumour, diagnosed one week after the election. University of Adelaide Professor and Political Commentator Clem McIntyre said the absence of Such virtually guaranteed that Brock would back Labor – with 24 seats required to govern, Brock duly provided support to the incumbent Labor government, allowing Weatherill to continue in office as head of a minority government. McIntyre said:

If Geoff Brock had gone with the Liberals, then the Parliament would have effectively been tied 23 to 23, so once Bob Such became ill and stepped away then Geoff Brock, I think had no choice but to side with Labor.

It is Labor's longest-serving South Australian government and the second longest-serving South Australian government behind the Playmander-assisted Liberal and Country League government of 1933-1965, which served first under Richard Layton Butler and then Thomas Playford IV. It is also the third time that any party has won four consecutive election victories in South Australia, after the LCL's 10 consecutive victories from 1933 to 1965 (the last eight under Playford) and Labor's four consecutive victories between 1970 and 1977 under Don Dunstan.

Recent hung parliaments occurred when Labor came to government in 2002 and prior to that when the state Liberal retained government in 1997 which saw the South Australian Division of the Liberal Party of Australia, created in 1974, win re-election for the first time.

The Liberals were reduced to 21 seats in May 2014 when Martin Hamilton-Smith became an independent and entered cabinet with Brock. Both Hamilton-Smith and Brock agreed to support the Labor government on confidence and supply while retaining the right to otherwise vote on conscience. Labor went from minority to majority government when Nat Cook won the 2014 Fisher by-election by five votes from a 7.3 percent two-party swing which was triggered by the death of Such. Despite this, the Jay Weatherill Labor government kept Brock and Hamilton-Smith in cabinet, giving the government a 26 to 21 parliamentary majority.

Like federal elections, South Australia has compulsory voting, uses full-preference instant-runoff voting in the lower house and single transferable vote group voting tickets in the proportionally represented upper house. The election was conducted by the Electoral Commission of South Australia (ECSA), an independent body answerable to Parliament.

Results

House of Assembly

The Liberals took three seats from Labor resulting in a hung parliament with 23 seats for Labor and 22 for the Liberals. The balance of power rested with the two crossbench independents, Bob Such and Geoff Brock. Such did not indicate who he would support in a minority government before he went on medical leave for a brain tumour, diagnosed one week after the election. University of Adelaide Professor and Political Commentator Clem McIntyre said the absence of Such virtually guaranteed that Brock would back Labor – with 24 seats required to govern, Brock duly provided support to the incumbent Labor government, allowing Premier Jay Weatherill to continue in office as head of a minority government. McIntyre said:

If Geoff Brock had gone with the Liberals, then the Parliament would have effectively been tied 23 to 23, so once Bob Such became ill and stepped away then Geoff Brock, I think had no choice but to side with Labor.

In a joint press conference with Weatherill, Brock said Such's absence prompted him to make his decision a week sooner than planned. The new government was sworn in on 26 March, with Brock in cabinet as Minister for Regional Development and Local Government. The Liberals were reduced to 21 seats in May 2014 when Martin Hamilton-Smith became an independent and entered cabinet as Minister for Investment and Trade, Defence Industries and Veterans Affairs. Both Hamilton-Smith and Brock agreed to support the Labor government on confidence and supply while retaining the right to otherwise vote on conscience. Labor achieved majority government when Nat Cook won the 2014 Fisher by-election by five votes from a 7.3 percent two-party swing which was triggered by the death of Such. Despite this, the Jay Weatherill Labor government kept Brock and Hamilton-Smith in cabinet, giving the government a 26 to 21 parliamentary majority.

|}

Independents: Bob Such, Geoff Brock

Although the state-wide two-party vote (2PP) was 47.0% Labor v 53.0% Liberal, the Adelaide metropolitan area containing over 75% of South Australia's population and 72% of seats (34 of 47) recorded a 2PP of 51.5% Labor v 48.5% Liberal.

Seat movement
The following seats changed hands:

Pendulum

The following Mackerras pendulum works by lining up all of the seats according to the percentage point margin on a two candidate preferred basis based on the 2014 results. "Safe" seats require a swing of over 10 per cent to change, "fairly safe" seats require a swing of between 6 and 10 per cent, while "marginal" seats require a swing of less than 6 per cent.

Legislative Council

|}

1 Appointed by casual vacancy in 2011
2 Elected from Labor ticket, became independent in 2011

Date
The last state election was held on 20 March 2010 to elect members for the House of Assembly and half of the members in the Legislative Council. In South Australia, section 28 of the Constitution Act 1934, as amended in 2001, directs that parliaments have fixed four-year terms, and elections must be held on the third Saturday in March every four years unless this date falls the day after Good Friday, occurs within the same month as a Commonwealth election, or the conduct of the election could be adversely affected by a state disaster. Section 28 also states that the Governor may also dissolve the Assembly and call an election for an earlier date if the Government has lost the confidence of the Assembly or a bill of special importance has been rejected by the Legislative Council. Section 41 states that both the Council and the Assembly may also be dissolved simultaneously if a deadlock occurs between them.

The Electoral (Miscellaneous) Amendment Act 2013 introduced set dates for writs for General elections in South Australia. The writ sets the dates for the close of the electoral roll and the close of nominations for an election. The Electoral Act 1985 requires that, for a general election, the writ be issued 28 days before the date fixed for polling (S47(2a)) and the electoral roll be closed at 12 noon, 6 days after the issue of the writ (S48(3(a)(i). The close of nominations will be at 12 noon 3 days after the close of rolls (Electoral Act 1985 S48(4)(a) and S4(1)). Since the previous election, five new parties had registered: Fishing and Lifestyle Party, Liberal Democratic Party, Multicultural Progress Party, Stop Population Growth Now, and Katter's Australian Party. Six were no longer registered: The Democrats, Save the RAH, Gamers 4 Croydon, Democratic Labor Party, One Nation, and United Party.

Polling Day for the 2014 South Australian State election was Saturday 15 March 2014 from 8am until 6pm. The Issue of Writ for the 2014 South Australian State election was Saturday 15 February 2014. The Electoral Roll closed at 12 noon, Friday 21 February 2014.  Nominations for candidates wishing to stand for election closed at 12 noon, Monday 24 February 2014, with the ballot order for both houses drawn and released shortly after, followed by close and release of upper house above-the-line preference tickets. Lower house how-to-vote card lodgements closed at 12 noon, 7 March 2014.

The 2014 Tasmanian state election occurred on the same day.

Background

The centre-left Australian Labor Party, led by Premier Jay Weatherill, and the centre-right Liberal Party of Australia, led by Leader of the Opposition Steven Marshall, are the two main parties in South Australia. In the 2010 state election, of 47 seats total, the Labor Party won 26 seats and the Liberal Party won 18 seats. Three seats were won by independents, Bob Such (Fisher), Geoff Brock (Frome), and Don Pegler (Mount Gambier). Smaller parties which held no seats in the lower House but achieved significant votes in 2010 include the SA Greens and the Family First Party. In the upper house, the Labor Party held eight seats, the Liberal Party held seven seats, the SA Greens, the Family First Party, and No Pokies all held two seats each, and Dignity for Disability held one seat.

A Port Adelaide by-election and a Ramsay by-election occurred on 11 February 2012, Labor retained both seats.

Retiring MPs

Labor
 Lyn Breuer MHA (Giles)
 Patrick Conlon MHA (Elder)
 Robyn Geraghty MHA (Torrens)
 John Hill MHA (Kaurna)
 Michael O'Brien MHA (Napier)
 Gay Thompson MHA (Reynell)
 Michael Wright MHA (Lee)
 Carmel Zollo MLC

Liberal
 Ivan Venning MHA (Schubert)

Other
 Ann Bressington MLC

Redistributions and the two-party vote
To produce 'fair' boundaries, which has a history going back to the mid-1900s Playmander, the Electoral Commission of South Australia has been required following the 1989 election to redraw boundaries after each election through a "fairness" provision with the objective that the party which receives over 50 percent of the statewide two-party vote at the forthcoming election should win the two-party vote in a majority of seats.

Labor's success in South Australia since the end of the Playmander has been based in part on the strength of its dominance in Adelaide. South Australia is the most centralised state in Australia; while 1.7 million people live in South Australia, 1.3 million of them live in Adelaide − uniquely, over 75 percent of the state's population and 72 percent of seats (34 of 47) are located in the metropolitan area alongside a lack of comparatively-sized rural population centres. Therefore, to a far greater extent than is the case in the rest of Australia, the metropolitan area tends to decide election outcomes. Under normal conditions, Labor wins the most seats in Adelaide, with the Liberal vote locked up in ultra-safe rural seats.

In 2010, for instance, the Liberals picked up a swing of 8.4 percent, more than the uniform 6.9 percent swing that the Boundaries Commission envisaged as being enough for a Liberal win. However, most of that swing came in seats that would have stayed in Labor hands in any event; while 22 seats saw double-digit swings, Labor sat on insurmountably safe margins in 16 of them. Additionally, while the Liberals took three Adelaide-area seats off Labor, it only won six additional seats in the capital. While six of the Liberals' 13 safe two-party seats were urban, all but one of their four marginal seats were urban. As a result, while the Liberals won 51.6 percent of the two-party vote, Labor only suffered an overall three-seat swing, allowing it to hold onto a two-seat majority.

The 2014 election saw more of the same. While the state-wide two-party vote (2PP) was 47.0% Labor v 53.0% Liberal, the metropolitan area recorded a 2PP of 51.5% Labor v 48.5% Liberal. The Liberals only won 12 of the 34 metropolitan seats; while only four of their 14 safe two-party seats were urban, all eight non-safe (<10 percent) seats were urban. Overall, the election resulted in a hung parliament with 23 seats for Labor and 22 for the Liberals. The balance of power rested with the two crossbench independents, Bob Such and Geoff Brock. Their seats, Fisher and Frome, both returned clear Liberal two-party votes but elected independents. 24 seats had returned a Liberal two-party vote, 23 seats returned a Labor two-party vote, therefore the "fairness" provision was met.

One element of the Playmander remains to this day − the House of Assembly is still elected using single-member seats. Prior to the Playmander, the House of Assembly had always been elected using multi-member seats since the inaugural 1857 election.

Each Labor period of government since the end of the Playmander had at least one comprehensive win, allowing often-Liberal seats to be won by Labor candidates who then built up incumbency and personal popularity. Examples in 2014 were Mawson, Newland and Light, and additionally in 2010, Bright and Hartley – all gained at the 2006 election landslide. Mawson in fact swung toward Labor in 2010 and 2014 despite the statewide trend. The bellwether seat of Colton was retained by Labor. Furthermore, all but two of the nine Liberal-held metropolitan seats saw swings against the Liberals.

In 2014, referring to the 1989 fairness legislation, Premier Jay Weatherill said "Complaining about the rules when you designed the rules I think sits ill on the mouth of the Liberal Party", while Electoral Commissioner Kay Mousley said it was an "impossible" task for the Boundaries Commission to achieve the legislated requirement, stating "It is a constitutional requirement, and until the constitution gets changed, I must say I find it a very inexact science". Additionally, she had previously stated in 2010 "Had the Liberal Party achieved a uniform swing it would have formed Government. The Commission has no control over, and can accept no responsibility for, the quality of the candidates, policies and campaigns." University of Adelaide Professor of Politics Clem Macintyre stated after the 2014 election that fair electoral boundaries are an "impossible challenge".

The Liberal Party disagreed with that assessment, and submitted that Hartley, Elder and Bright should be moved from Labor to Liberal.

The Australian Broadcasting Corporation's election expert Antony Green expected that the Labor government's parliamentary majority from the 2010 election would be redistributed away. However, the draft redistribution, which altered the boundaries of 36 of 47 seats, nominally gave Labor 26 seats and the Liberals 21 seats on a two-party basis. Although held by an independent member, Frome was proposed to be moved from Labor to Liberal on a two-party basis. It was also proposed that the Norwood be renamed Dunstan.

The final redistribution was released in August 2012. The renaming of the seat of Norwood to Dunstan occurred. On Antony Green's calculations, the notional two-party margin in Frome went from 0.1 percent Labor to 1.7 percent Liberal, Ashford went from 4.8 percent to 0.6 percent for Labor, Hartley went from 2.3 percent to 0.1 percent for Labor, Elder went from 3.6 percent to 2.0 percent for Labor and Light went from 5.3 percent to 2.8 percent for Labor, amongst other boundary and margin reductions and increases. All redistribution figures and swings used are based on Antony Green's booth-based declaration vote calculations rather than the electoral commission's seat-based declaration vote calculations.

Polling

Polling conducted by Newspoll and published in The Australian was conducted via random telephone number selection in city and country areas. Sampling sizes usually consisted of over 800 electors, while the 10–13 March 2014 poll consisted of 1602 electors. The declared margin of errors at these sample sizes were ±3.5 percent and ±2.5 percent respectively. Two-party preferred figures were calculated based on preference flows at the 2010 state election.

See also
 Candidates of the South Australian state election, 2014
 Members of the South Australian House of Assembly, 2014–2018
 Members of the South Australian Legislative Council, 2014–2018
 2010 South Australian state election
 2018 South Australian state election

References

External links
 2014 SA election: Antony Green ABC
 2014 SA election: Poll Bludger
 2014 SA election: Tally Room
 Electoral Commission of South Australia (ECSA)
 Lower house how-to-vote cards and upper house above-the-line preference tickets: ECSA
 Polls point towards possible hung Parliament: ABC 14 March 2014
 Advertiser-Galaxy poll shows Labor ahead 51-49 in two critical marginal seats & chance to deny Libs majority government: The Advertiser 15 March 2014
 Galaxy; 51-49 to Labor in Newland and Mitchell (SA): Poll Bludger 13 March 2014

2014 elections in Australia
Elections in South Australia
2010s in South Australia
March 2014 events in Australia